Harry Williams (born 1883) was an English footballer. His regular position was as a forward. He was born in Farnworth. He played for Bolton Wanderers, Burnley, Leeds City, and Manchester United.

External links
MUFCInfo.com profile

1883 births
English footballers
Bolton Wanderers F.C. players
Manchester United F.C. players
Burnley F.C. players
Leeds City F.C. players
Year of death missing
Association football forwards